Chermen Kobesov (born 4 January 1996) is a Russian para-athlete in the T37 classification. He represented Russian Paralympic Committee athletes at the 2020 Summer Paralympics.

Paralympics
Kobesov represented Russian Paralympic Committee athletes at the 2020 Summer Paralympics in the 100 metres T37 event and finished in fourth place with a seasons best time of 11.32. He also competed in the 400 metres T37 event finished with a personal best time of 50.44 and won a bronze medal.

MMA Career
After the Russian Paralympic Committee was banned from the 2016 Paralympic Games in Rio de Janeiro, he decided to pursue a second sporting career in mixed martial arts.

References

1996 births
Living people
People from North Ossetia–Alania
Russian male long jumpers
Russian male sprinters
Paralympic bronze medalists for the Russian Paralympic Committee athletes
Paralympic medalists in athletics (track and field)
Athletes (track and field) at the 2020 Summer Paralympics
Medalists at the 2020 Summer Paralympics
Medalists at the World Para Athletics European Championships
Medalists at the World Para Athletics Championships
Sportspeople from North Ossetia–Alania
20th-century Russian people
21st-century Russian people